K. Kalimuthu (14 July 1942 – 8 November 2006) was an Indian politician of the Anna Dravida Munnetra Kazhagam and Member of the Tamil Nadu Legislative Assembly. He served as the Speaker of the Tamil Nadu Legislative Assembly from 2001 to 2006. He was elected to the state Assembly 5 times and held posts as the Minister for local administration one term and as Agriculture minister for two terms under Dr. M. G. Ramachandran as chief Minister, was the Member of Lok Sabha once and Tamil Nadu Legislative Assembly speaker once. He was an M.A in Tamil. He gained a doctorate (Ph.D) in Tamil for his literary works and wrote books and poems in Tamil.
K. Kalimuthu was born in Ramuthevanpatti, Virudhunagar district, Tamil Nadu. He served twice as the presidium chairman of the AIADMK in 2000-2002 and in 2006 till his death.  

He died of cardiac arrest in Chennai in November 2006.

Controversies 
According to prosecution, Kalimuthu in his capacity as the then Agriculture Minister allegedly directed nine nationalised banks to provide Rs 56 lakh loan to Mayne and others for purchasing tractors in 1983. Mayne and the other accused allegedly submitted forged documents to avail loans. The charge sheet had also said Kalimuthu had parked huge amount of funds belonging to Tamil Nadu State Agricultural Marketing Board with nationalised banks.
CBI had filed a charge sheet against a total of 32 persons in 1988 but only 16 were present in the court in 2016 as others either died or are absconding.

Convicting the 71-year old Mayne of offences including cheating, criminal conspiracy, forgery, the Judge sentenced him to seven years rigorous imprisonment And also imposed a hefty fine of Rs 1.67 crore on Mayne and other convicts, his accomplices. Out of the total fine amount, Rs 57 lakh should be provided to the nine banks as compensation.Others sentenced are Surya Kumar (four years RI) Shahul Hameed (two years RI), Basin Sen (two years RI) and Soma Sundaram (three years RI).

Court also acquitted 11 other accused in the case related to alleged availing of loans to the tune of Rs 56 lakh from nine nationalised banks by submitting forged documents in 1983 when Kalimuthu was Agriculture Minister in the state.

References

All India Anna Dravida Munnetra Kazhagam politicians
2006 deaths
1942 births
Speakers of the Tamil Nadu Legislative Assembly
People from Virudhunagar district
India MPs 1989–1991
Lok Sabha members from Tamil Nadu

Tamil Nadu MLAs 1985–1989